Carex obscura is a tussock-forming species of perennial sedge in the family Cyperaceae. It is native to parts of Asia from Pakistan in the west to China in the east.

It was described by the botanist Christian Gottfried Daniel Nees von Esenbeck in 1834 as published in Contributions to the Botany of India.

See also
List of Carex species

References

obscura
Plants described in 1834
Taxa named by Christian Gottfried Daniel Nees von Esenbeck
Flora of China
Flora of Pakistan
Flora of Nepal
Flora of Tibet